The 1997 Omloop Het Volk was the 51st edition of the Omloop Het Volk cycle race and was held on 1 March 1997. The race started in Ghent and finished in Lokeren. The race was won by Peter Van Petegem.

General classification

References

1997
Omloop Het Nieuwsblad
Omloop Het Nieuwsblad
March 1997 sports events in Europe